Eduard Borisov (born 3 February 1934) is a Soviet boxer. He competed in the men's welterweight event at the 1956 Summer Olympics.

References

1934 births
Living people
Soviet male boxers
Olympic boxers of the Soviet Union
Boxers at the 1956 Summer Olympics
Place of birth missing (living people)
Welterweight boxers